The 89th Emperor's Cup began on September 19, 2009 and ended on January 1, 2010 with the final at National Stadium in Tokyo, Japan. Gamba Osaka won the title for two years in a row. Since Gamba already confirmed 2010 AFC Champions League berth, the last spot of ACL for J.League club is awarded to Sanfrecce Hiroshima, which finished as 4th place of 2009 J.League Division 1.

Calendar

Participants

Starting in the First Round
Prefectural finals winners – 47 teams

Hokkaidō – Norbritz Hokkaido
Aomori – Hachinohe University
Iwate – Grulla Morioka
Miyagi – Sony Sendai
Akita – TDK SC
Yamagata – FC Parafrente Yonezawa
Fukushima – Fukushima United
Ibaraki – Ryutsu Keizai University
Tochigi – Vertfee Takahara Nasu
Gunma – Arte Takasaki
Saitama – Shobi University
Chiba – Juntendo University
Tokyo – Meiji University
Kanagawa – Tokai University
Niigata – Japan Soccer College
Toyama – Valiente Toyama
Ishikawa – Zweigen Kanazawa
Fukui – Saurcos Fukui
Yamanashi – FC Koun
Nagano – Matsumoto Yamaga
Gifu – FC Gifu Second
Shizuoka – Honda FC
Aichi – FC Kariya
Mie – Mie Chukyo University
Shiga – Biwako Seikei Sport College
Kyoto – SP Kyoto
Osaka – Kansai University
Hyōgo – Kwansei Gakuin University
Nara – Nara Club
Wakayama – Arterivo Wakayama
Tottori – Tottori Dreams FC
Shimane – Hamada FC Cosmos
Okayama – Mitsubishi Motors Mizushima
Hiroshima – Fukuyama University
Yamaguchi – Renofa Yamaguchi
Tokushima – Tokushima Vortis Second
Kagawa – Kamatamare Sanuki
Ehime – Ehime FC Shimanami
Kochi – Kochi University
Fukuoka – New Wave Kitakyushu
Saga – Saga Higashi High School
Nagasaki – V-Varen Nagasaki
Kumamoto – Kumamoto Gakuen University
Ōita – Nippon Bunri University
Miyazaki – Honda Lock
Kagoshima – National Institute of Fitness and Sports in Kanoya
Okinawa – Okinawa Kariyushi FC

Prime Minister Cup University football tournament winners – 1 team
Fukuoka University

Starting in the Second Round
J.League Division 1 – 18 teams

Montedio Yamagata
Kashima Antlers
Omiya Ardija
Urawa Red Diamonds
Kashiwa Reysol
JEF United Chiba
FC Tokyo
Kawasaki Frontale
Yokohama F. Marinos
Shimizu S-Pulse
Júbilo Iwata
Nagoya Grampus
Albirex Niigata
Kyoto Sanga
Gamba Osaka
Vissel Kobe
Sanfrecce Hiroshima
Oita Trinita

J.League Division 2 – 18 teams

Consadole Sapporo
Vegalta Sendai
Mito HollyHock
Tochigi SC
Thespa Kusatsu
Tokyo Verdy
Yokohama FC
Shonan Bellmare
Ventforet Kofu
Kataller Toyama
FC Gifu
Cerezo Osaka}
Fagiano Okayama
Tokushima Vortis
Ehime FC
Avispa Fukuoka
Sagan Tosu
Roasso Kumamoto

Japan Football League – 4 teams

Sagawa Shiga
Gainare Tottori
Yokogawa Musashino
JEF Reserves

※Clubs ranked from first to fourth at the end of the 17th week of 2009 Japan Football League.

Matches
All matches are Japan Standard Time (UTC+9)

First round

Second round

Third round

Fourth round

Quarter finals

Semi finals

Final

External links
 Official site of the 89th Emperor's Cup 

2009 domestic association football cups
2009
2009 in Japanese football
2010 in Japanese football